The Dublin county football team represents Dublin in men's Gaelic football and is governed by Dublin GAA, the county board of the Gaelic Athletic Association. The team competes in the three major annual inter-county competitions; the All-Ireland Senior Football Championship, the Leinster Senior Football Championship and the National Football League.

Dublin's official home ground is Parnell Park, Donnycarney. However, the team generally plays its home games at Croke Park. The team's manager is Dessie Farrell.

The team last won the Leinster Senior Championship in 2021, the All-Ireland Senior Championship in 2020 and the National League in 2021.

Dublin claimed eleven consecutive Leinster Senior Football Championships following a three-point victory over Wexford in 2011, a three-point victory over Meath in 2012, a seven-point victory over Meath in 2013, a sixteen-point victory over Meath in 2014, a thirteen-point victory over Westmeath in 2015, a fifteen-point victory over Westmeath in 2016, a nine-point victory over Kildare in 2017, an eighteen-point victory over Laois in 2018, a sixteen-point victory over Meath in 2019, a twenty one-point victory over Meath in 2020 and an eight-point victory over Kildare in 2021.

Colours and crest

Kit evolution
Till 1918, Dublin wore the colours of the Club Champions as was also the case in many other counties. In 1918 they adopted the well-known sky shirt with the Dublin shield, even if the kit has been for many years different compared to the actual one: collar and shorts were in fact white and the socks hooped, white and blue. The change to the present look, with dark blue details, shorts and socks, was made in 1974. Navy sleeves on the jersey were not used from 2013 until 2023.

Team sponsorship
The following is a list of sponsors of the Dublin county football team (senior).

History
Wexford defeated Dublin in the final of the 1890 Leinster Senior Football Championship (SFC). Dublin won its first Leinster SFC the following year by defeating Kildare in the final, and followed up by winning its first All-Ireland Senior Football Championship (SFC) by defeating Cork by a scoreline of 2–1 to 1–1 in the 1891 All-Ireland Senior Football Championship Final. Dublin retained the Leinster SFC in 1892, defeating Louth in the final and then retained the All-Ireland SFC with victory over Kerry by a scoreline of 1–4 to 0–3 in the 1892 All-Ireland Senior Football Championship Final.

Heffernan and Hanahoe: 1974–1986

Starting from the 1970s, the Dublin team managed by Kevin Heffernan (and briefly by Tony Hanahoe) won four All-Ireland SFCs (1974, 1976, 1977 and 1983) and seven Leinster Senior Football Championship (SFC) titles (six of which were consecutive). It was also the first team to play in six consecutive All-Ireland SFC finals (from 1974 to 1979), a feat later matched by Kerry in 2009.

In January 1986, Heffernan resigned as Dublin manager.

Post-Heffernan years: 1986–2008
Dublin and Meath were involved in one of the most famous of Leinster SFC encounters in 1991, the Dublin and Meath four-parter. The teams had to go to three replays in their Leinster SFC first round match before a winner could be found. This series of games had the added factor of Dublin and Meath being long-time fierce rivals, a rivalry that intensified when Meath won four from the previous five Leinster SFCs and two All-Ireland SFCs over the previous five years, to replace Dublin as the strongest team in the province of Leinster. Meath eventually won the series, thanks to a last-minute goal scored by Kevin Foley, and a point scored by David Beggy, in the third replay. Foley took seven steps for the winning goal.

Dublin qualified for the 1992 All-Ireland Senior Football Championship Final by defeating surprise Munster champions Clare in the All-Ireland SFC semi-final. However, the county was surprised itself in the final to be defeated unexpectedly by Donegal.

Dublin qualified for the 1994 All-Ireland Senior Football Championship Final by defeating surprise Connacht champions Leitrim in the All-Ireland SFC semi-final. However, the county lost to Down in the final on this occasion.

Gilroy, Gavin, Farrell: 2008–

In the 2010s, Dublin produced the greatest teams in modern times. The Dubs won seven All-Ireland SFCs in this decade (five of which were consecutive, the first team to achieve this feat). Six of these were won without defeat (with the exception of one loss to Jim McGuinness's Donegal in the 2014 All-Ireland semi-final). Dublin limited Cork, Donegal and Kerry to a single All-Ireland SFC each during that decade.

Pat Gilroy led Dublin to the first of these All-Ireland SFCs in 2011.

Jim Gavin led Dublin to the next six from 2013, including the five-in-a-row from 2015 onwards.

He introduced new players to the team each year, starting with Paul Mannion and Jack McCaffrey in 2013, continuing with Cormac Costello and Nicky Devereaux in 2014, followed by Brian Fenton and John Small in 2015 and Davy Byrne in 2016.

On 25 March 2017, when beating Roscommon by 2–29 to 0–14 in a National League game at Croke Park, Dublin set a new record of playing 35 games in League and Championship without defeat. The previous record, held by Kerry, had stood for 84 years.

Jim Gavin continued to introduce new players, with Con O'Callaghan and Niall Scully appearing in 2017 and Brian Howard and Eoin Murchan emerging in 2018. But Gavin tended to wait one year from when he noticed them to introduce them to his team, O'Callaghan having been ready in 2016 and Howard in 2017.

Jim Gavin stood down as manager in 2019.

Alan Brogan noted in 2020: "The only year he didn't do it [introduce new players] was last year. Last year, [Jim Gavin] kept with the same players which, in hindsight, leads you to believe that maybe he had it in the back of his mind it would be his final year".

Dessie Farrell replaced him.

Mayo defeated Dublin in the semi-final of the 2021 All-Ireland SFC, ending a record run of six consecutive All-Ireland SFC titles for Dublin and marking the team's first championship loss since the 2014 semi-final. A year later, Dublin met the same fate when Kerry defeated Dublin in the 2022 All-Ireland SFC semi-final,  Kerry's first victory against Dublin since 2009.

Current management team
As of December 2020:
Manager: Dessie Farrell
Selectors: Shane O'Hanlon, Mick Galvin, Brian O'Regan
Coach: Darren Daly
Physiotherapists: James Allen, Niall Barry, Kieran O'Reilly
Analysis team: Stephen Behan, John Courtney, Frankie Roeback, Ciarán Toner
Kitmen: David Boylan, John Campbell
Performance development coach: Bryan Cullen
Media manager: Seamus McCormack
Goalkeeping coach: Josh Moran
Team doctors: Kieran O'Malley, Diarmuid Smith
Sports therapists: Richard Daly, Paul Donnelly
Nutritionists: Daniel Davey, Neil Irwin
Cameraman: Chris Farrell
Logistics: David Hendrick
Development gym coach: Shane Malone
Gym coach: Tommy Mooney
Performance consultants: Brendan Murphy, Seán Murphy

Current panel

INJ Player has had an injury which has affected recent involvement with the county team.
RET Player has since retired from the county team.
WD Player has since withdrawn from the county team due to a non-injury issue.

Recent call-ups
The following players have also been called up to the Dublin panel, with their most recent game supplied.

Supporters

Dublin supporters are commonly known as The Dubs, and in the 1970s as Heffo's army.
While songs are still popular with the Dublin fans they tend to be Dublin-centric, such as "Molly Malone" and "Dublin in the Rare Old Times", or focus on the team itself, singing "Come on You Boys in Blue".

The Hill 16 end in Croke Park is an area for which many Dubs hold a special affection and it is not uncommon to see the Hill filled entirely with Dubs. Dublin supporters have been known to chant "Hill 16 is Dublin only" as a humorous jibe at supporters from rival teams.

The Dublin team are sometimes called The Jacks, with the ladies called The Jackies. These names came from a shortening of the word Jackeen.

Rivalries
Dublin's biggest rivalry has been with nearby Meath. Both counties were the strongest sides from Leinster during the 1970s and 1980s. The 1991 four-game tie added to the intensity between the two counties. The Dublin football team also shares a rivalry with neighbours Kildare. Lesser local rivalries exist with nearby Wicklow, Laois and Westmeath.

On a national level Dublin's rivalry with Kerry is one of Ireland's most renowned. The rivalry between the two counties intensified in the 1970s and early 1980s. Other smaller footballing rivalries have developed over the decades between Dublin and teams such as Cork, Tyrone (see Battle of Omagh), Donegal and Galway, who Dublin played in the 1983 Final known as the Game of Shame.

Managerial history
Dublin — like Cork, Kerry and Tyrone — traditionally appoints managers from inside, rather than seeking a "foreign" appointment.

Kevin Heffernan 1974–76

Tony Hanahoe 1976–78

Kevin Heffernan (2) 1978–86

Brian Mullins, Robbie Kelleher & Seán Doherty 1986

Gerry McCaul 1986–90

Paddy Cullen 1990–92

Pat O'Neill 1992–95

Mickey Whelan 1995–97

Tommy Carr 1997–01

Tommy Lyons 2001–04

Paul Caffrey 2004–08

Pat Gilroy 2008–12

Jim Gavin 2012–2019

Dessie Farrell 2019–

Players

Notable players

Records
Johnny Joyce, by scoring 5–3 against Longford in 1960, set a record for the highest individual scorer in any championship football match. Rory Gallagher of Fermanagh, with 3–9 against Monaghan in 2002, matched this record after 42 years. Cillian O'Connor's four goals (accompanied by nine points) in the 2020 All-Ireland Senior Football Championship semi-final at Croke Park broke that record after a further 18 years.
In 1995, Brian Stynes became the second former AFL player to win the Sam Maguire Cup, following Dermot McNicholl in 1993.
Dean Rock holds the record for the fastest goal scored in the history of All-Ireland SFC finals, after sending the ball past David Clarke directly from the throw-in of the 2020 final, breaking Kerryman Garry McMahon's record which had stood since the 1962 final.

Most appearances

Stephen Cluxton made his 112th appearance in the All-Ireland Football Championship when he captained Dublin to their six-in-a-row on 19 December 2020.

Cluxton became his county's most capped player, overtaking Johnny McDonnell's record against Meath in the National League on 17 October 2020.

Top scorers
Dean Rock is the team's all-time record scorer, surpassing the long-time record of Jimmy Keaveney against Meath on 17 October 2020. The early goal for Rock in this National League match at Parnell Park  meant Rock had scored 17–442 (493), one ahead of Keaveney's 30–402 (492). Rock achieved this in 95 appearances to Keaveney's 104.

Cú Chulainn Awards

1963: Paddy Holden, Des Foley, Mickey Whelan
1964: Paddy Holden2nd 
1965: Paddy Holden3rd, Des Foley2nd

Texaco Footballer of the Year

1963: Lar Foley
1974: Kevin Heffernan
1976: Jimmy Keaveney
1977: Jimmy Keaveney2nd
1983: Tommy Drumm
1995: Paul Curran
2010: Bernard Brogan Jnr
2011: Alan Brogan

All Stars

6 All Stars: Cluxton, Kilkenny
5 All Stars: Fenton, O'Leary
4 All Stars: B. Brogan Jnr, J. McCaffrey, McCarthy, Cullen, Flynn, Kelleher, Drumm
3 All Stars: A. Brogan, O'Toole, B. Rock, Redmond, O'Sullivan, O'Callaghan, D. Rock, Keaveney, Fitzsimons, Curran, Mannion
2 All Stars: Doyle, Howard, Mullins, Whelan, Hickey, Connolly, O'Driscoll, Hargan, Cooper, Barr, Duff, MacAuley, McMahon, O'Carroll

All Stars Footballer of the Year

2010: Bernard Brogan Jnr
2011: Alan Brogan
2013: Michael Darragh Macauley
2015: Jack McCaffrey
2018: Brian Fenton
2019: Stephen Cluxton
2020: Brian Fenton2nd

All Stars Young Footballer of the Year

2017: Con O'Callaghan

GPA Gaelic Football Team of the Year
2006: Stephen Cluxton, Bryan Cullen, Alan Brogan
2007: Stephen Cluxton2nd, Barry Cahill, Alan Brogan2nd
2010: Philly McMahon, Bernard Brogan Jnr*
2010 was the final year of the GPA Gaelic Football Team of the Year and the GPA Footballer of the Year as it was amalgamated with the All Star Awards.

GPA footballer of the year
2010: Bernard Brogan Jnr

Under 21 Footballer of the Year
2010: Rory O'Carroll
2012: Ciarán Kilkenny
2014: Conor McHugh
2017: Aaron Byrne

Under 20 Footballer of the Year
2019: Ciarán Archer

Honours

Dublin has won the All-Ireland Senior Football Championship (SFC) final on 30 occasions – only Kerry, with 37 All-Ireland SFC titles, has won more. Dublin defeated Mayo by five points in the 132nd All-Ireland Final on 19 December 2020. This was their eighth championship since 2011. Dublin is the only county team in men's football or hurling to have won six consecutive All-Ireland Championships.

Dublin has also won the Leinster Championship on 60 occasions, and is the current Leinster champion, having beaten Kildare in 2021. This result was their consecutive eighth, making history and saw it become Leinster champions for the twelfth time in thirteen years. Only Meath has split their wins, winning the Leinster Championship in 2010.

Dublin has won the National Football League on 14 occasions, most recently in 2013, 2014, 2015, 2016, 2018 and 2021. Only Kerry (21) has more league titles.

National
All-Ireland Senior Football Championship
 Winners (30): 1891, 1892, 1894, 1897, 1898, 1899, 1901, 1902, 1906, 1907, 1908, 1921, 1922, 1923, 1942, 1958, 1963, 1974, 1976, 1977, 1983, 1995, 2011, 2013, 2015, 2016,  2017, 2018, 2019, 2020
 Runners-up (13): 1896, 1904, 1920, 1924, 1934, 1955, 1975, 1978, 1979, 1984, 1985, 1992, 1994
National Football League
 Winners (14): 1952–53, 1954–55, 1957–58, 1975–76, 1977–78, 1986–87, 1990–91, 1992–93, 2013, 2014, 2015, 2016, 2018, 2021 (shared)
 Runners-up (14): 1925–26, 1933–34, 1940–41, 1951–52, 1961–62, 1966–67, 1974–75, 1976–77, 1987–88, 1988–89, 1998–99, 2011, 2017, 2020
All-Ireland Junior Football Championship
 Winners (6): 1914, 1916, 1939, 1948, 1960, 2008
All-Ireland Under-21/Under-20 Football Championship
 Winners (5): 2003, 2010, 2012, 2014, 2017
 Runners-up (5): 1975, 1980, 2002, 2019, 2020
All-Ireland Minor Football Championship
 Winners (11): 1930, 1945, 1954, 1955, 1956, 1958, 1959, 1979, 1982, 1984, 2012
 Runners-up (7): 1946, 1948, 1978, 1988, 2001, 2003, 2011

Provincial
Leinster Senior Football Championship
 Winners (61): 1891, 1892, 1894, 1896, 1897, 1898, 1899, 1901, 1902, 1904, 1906, 1907, 1908, 1920, 1921, 1922, 1923, 1924, 1932, 1933, 1934, 1941, 1942, 1955, 1958, 1959, 1962, 1963, 1965, 1974, 1975, 1976, 1977, 1978, 1979, 1983, 1984, 1985, 1989, 1992, 1993, 1994, 1995, 2002, 2005, 2006, 2007, 2008, 2009, 2011, 2012, 2013, 2014, 2015, 2016, 2017, 2018, 2019, 2020, 2021, 2022
 Runners-up (23): 1890, 1895, 1910, 1912, 1915, 1917, 1919, 1927, 1928, 1944, 1957, 1961, 1964, 1980, 1982, 1986, 1987, 1988, 1990, 1996, 1999, 2000, 2001
O'Byrne Cup
 Winners (9): 1956, 1958, 1960, 1966, 1999, 2007, 2008, 2015, 2017
Leinster Junior Football Championship
 Winners (20): 1908, 1914, 1916, 1922, 1926, 1930, 1939, 1948, 1950, 1951, 1954, 1955, 1959, 1960, 1971, 1983, 1985, 1987, 1994, 2008
Leinster Under-21/Under-20 Football Championship
 Winners (16): 1974, 1975, 1980, 1984, 2002, 2003, 2005, 2009, 2010, 2012, 2014, 2015, 2016, 2017, 2019, 2020
 Runners-up (9): 1976, 1992, 1993, 1998, 2001, 2004, 2018, 2021, 2022
Leinster Minor Football Championship
 Winners (33): 1930, 1933, 1934, 1945, 1946, 1948, 1949, 1954, 1955, 1956, 1958, 1959, 1961, 1968, 1970, 1971, 1976, 1978, 1979, 1981, 1982, 1984, 1986, 1988, 1994, 1999, 2001, 2003, 2009, 2011, 2012, 2014, 2017
 Runners-up (16): 1929, 1935, 1947, 1950, 1962, 1963, 1967, 1969, 1972, 1977, 1987, 1991, 1996, 2000, 2019, 2021

Other
RTÉ Sports Team of the Year Award
 Winners (1): 2019

References

External links
 "Decades of the Dubs": 2000–2009

 
County football teams